La Maná Canton is a canton of Ecuador in the Cotopaxi Province. Its capital is the town of La Maná. Its population at the 2001 census was 32,115.

Demographics
Ethnic groups as of the Ecuadorian census of 2010:
Mestizo  81.6%
Montubio  6.5%
Afro-Ecuadorian  5.9%
White  3.9%
Indigenous  1.8%
Other  0.3%

References

Cantons of Cotopaxi Province